Blake Carpenter (born January 14, 1991) is a Republican member of the Kansas House of Representatives, representing the 81st district and is currently the speaker pro tem. He has served since 2015.

Biography
Carpenter's first step into politics was during college. While attending Wichita State University, he joined the College Republicans. After a few months of being actively involved with the group, he was elected vice-chairman in spring 2013. During the fall semester of 2013 the chairman of the College Republicans stepped down, and Carpenter stepped into the chairman's role. Carpenter remained the chairman until the end of the 2014 spring semester.

During the 2014 spring semester Carpenter had a class project to interview a state representative. He decided to interview his state representative who was Jim Howell. Howell was stepping down to run for the Sedgwick County Commission. During their conversation, Carpenter said he wanted to run for public office someday, and Howell asked him "Why not just do it now?”. After some consideration, Carpenter decided to run and began gathering petition signatures to get his name on the ballot. During the 2014 election cycle, Carpenter ran against Democrat Lynn Wells. In an interview with the Derby Informer newspaper, Carpenter described himself as having conservative values. Carpenter defeated Wells in the November general election.

After the election ended in November 2014, he graduated from Wichita State University in December with a Bachelor of Business Administration degree.
He currently serves as the House Majority Whip, a position he was elected to in December 2018, for a term starting in January 2019.

Carpenter and wife Cziara married each other in December 2013.

Representative Carpenter announced in October 2021 that he would be taking a leave of absence for the 2022 legislative session in order to complete a military obligation as an officer in the Kansas Air National Guard. Leah Howell, his predecessor's wife, was selected by Republican precinct committee members in the 81st District on Jan. 8, 2022 to serve in Representative Carpenter's place for the 2022 legislative session.

Committee membership
2015–2016 sessions
 Health and Human Services
 Education Budget (2015 Session Only)
 Judiciary (2016 Session Only)
 Veterans, Military and Homeland Security

2017–2018 sessions
 Chairman of the Joint Committee on Information Technology
 Vice-Chairman of Elections
 Federal and State Affairs
 Local Government
 Higher Education Budget

2019-2020 sessions
Vice Chairman of Elections
Federal and State Affairs
Insurance
Interstate Cooperation
Higher Education Budget

2021-2022 sessions
Chairman of Elections
Federal and State Affairs
Higher Education Budget

Endorsements
Carpenter has received past endorsements from the following organizations:
 Kansans for Life
 National Rifle Association (NRA) - A+ grade
 National Federation of Independent Business (NFIB)
 Kansas Chamber of Commerce PAC
 Kansas Realtors PAC

References

External links 
  Wichita Eagle Article 
  Derby Informer Article About Carpenter Running in 2014 
  Wichita State University Article About Carpenter Running in 2014 
  Kansas Legislature - Blake Carpenter 
 Kansans For Life Endorsement List
 NFIB Endorsement List

1991 births
21st-century American politicians
Living people
Republican Party members of the Kansas House of Representatives
Wichita State University alumni